Michael Alvin Maloy (May 10, 1949 – February 3, 2009) was an American-Austrian professional basketball player who played in the United States (in the ABA) and in Austria (in the OBB).

College career
Maloy attended Davidson College – though he never graduated – and was the first black player to play for the Davidson Wildcats men's basketball team, where he was a three-time All-American and Southern Conference Player of the Year in 1969 and 1970. Maloy is the school's all-time leading rebounder, with a 12.9 average, and the school's seventh-leading scorer with 1,661 career points scored.

Maloy also became the first African American to join a college fraternity at Davidson, when he was accepted into the school's Sigma Chi chapter in 1967.

Professional career
Upon becoming a professional, Maloy was drafted by the Boston Celtics of the NBA, but he rejected the NBA draft and played three seasons in the ABA instead, with the Virginia Squires and the Dallas Chaparrals. He later played professionally with UBSC Vienna in both the Austrian League and the EuroLeague.

National team career
After he became a naturalized citizen of Austria in 1980, Maloy was a member of the senior Austrian national team.

After basketball
Upon ending his pro basketball club playing career in Austria, Maloy coached Austrian youth teams. He also taught at the American International School of Vienna, Austria, where he coached a team as well.

Personal life
When he was not coaching or teaching, Maloy was a member of the Boring Blues Band, which performed regularly throughout Vienna.
Maloy died at the age of 59 on February 3, 2009, in Vienna following a severe case of the flu.

References

External links 
 Basketball-Reference.com
 Obituary - Charlotte Observer

1949 births
2009 deaths
All-American college men's basketball players
American emigrants to Austria
American expatriate basketball people in Austria 
American men's basketball players
Austrian men's basketball players
Basketball players from New York City
Boston Celtics draft picks
Centers (basketball)
Dallas Chaparrals players
Davidson Wildcats men's basketball players
Naturalised citizens of Austria
Power forwards (basketball)
Small forwards
Virginia Squires players